Istabraq (born 23 May 1992) is a retired Irish Thoroughbred racehorse who was most famous for his hurdling.  He won the Champion Hurdle on three occasions. He was trained by Aidan O'Brien and owned by John Patrick McManus. Jockey Charlie Swan rode him in all of his 29 races over jumps.

Early life 
Istabraq was bred for the flat, being by the outstanding champion sire Sadler's Wells, who won the Irish 2,000 Guineas over 1 mile and also being three parts brother to an Epsom Derby winner, Secreto. Istabraq was tried unsuccessfully over a  mile and failed to please his handlers and owner Sheikh Hamdan bin Rashid Al Maktoum of Shadwell Racing and a partner in his family's Godolphin Stables.

Jumps racing 
The horse was sold to John Durkan who had been an assistant to John Gosden with the Baring Bingham Novices' Hurdle as the target for the Cheltenham Festival. Durkan started training the horse but was diagnosed with leukemia and suggested that Aidan O'Brien train Istabraq while he was ill. The agreement was that when Durkan recovered, he would take over the training. However, he died just before Istabraq won the 1998 Irish Champion Hurdle. O'Brien continued to train the horse afterwards, and Durkan remained in the thoughts of the horse's connections. When riding the horse back after his 1998 Champion Hurdle win, jockey Charlie Swan said, 'This one's for John,' in an interview with Channel 4's Lesley Graham.

1996/1997: Novice hurdler
On 16 November 1996 Istabraq made his hurdling debut and lost by a head to Noble Thyne at Punchestown. Before his next race Istabraq was gelded. He won his next three races prior to the Cheltenham Festival. There he won the Royal & Sun Alliance Novice Hurdle from Mighty Moss.

1997/1998
Istabraq won the first four races of the season. In his fifth race of the season he started as favourite for the 1998 Champion Hurdle. Last years winner Make A Stand was a notable absence but the runner up Theatreworld returned as one of the 18 runners. Istabraq moved to the front three out before he accelerated rounding the home turn. The Champion Hurdle then became a procession in the home straight, as Istabraq won by 12 lengths from Theatreworld. The conditions for the Aintree Hurdle were soft, heavy in places with Istabraq the favourite. However Istabraq came second to Pridwell to end Istabraq's 10 race winning streak. This was Istabraq's last race of the season.

1998/1999
Like last season, Istabraq won his first four races. In his fifth race of the season he started the 1999 Champion Hurdle as favourite. He won by  lengths from Theatreworld to win his second Champion Hurdle. In the next race he beat French Holly at the Aintree Hurdle. He won his last race of the season at the Punchestown festival.

1999/2000 
Istabraq had his first start of the season in October at Tipperary in the John James McManus Memorial Hurdle. He beat Limestone Lad by 7 lengths. There was a rematch for Istabraq's second start of the season in the Hattons Grace Hurdle at Fairyhouse. This time Istabraq came second losing by  lengths to Limestone Lad also in soft conditions. Despite the loss Istabraq started the 2000 Champion Hurdle as favourite. He won by 4 lengths from Hors La Loi III. This victory was Istabraq's fourth straight win at the Cheltenham Festival. This was his last race of the season.

2000/2001 
He made his reappearance at Leopardstown for the December Festival Hurdle. He battled with Moscow Flyer before he fell at the last. This was the first time Istabraq fell. The race was won by Moscow Flyer. After the race winning jockey Barry Geraghty said "I thought I had Istabraq beat going to the last, I was the only one going in the right direction." Istabraq's jockey Charlie Swan however said "He was tired but he always finds something, however, he's always been vulnerable in those sort of conditions. He felt well and as good as ever during the race." On his next start, Istabraq won but this time Moscow Flyer fell. In Istabraq's next start, Istabraq again fell at the final flight, with Moscow Flyer the winner. After Istabraq won the AIG Europe Champion Hurdle near the end of January he was the odds on ante post favourite for the 2001 Champion Hurdle. However before the 2001 Cheltenham Festival, cases of foot-and-mouth disease started to appear in Britain. The festival was therefore abandoned.

2001/2002 
Istabraq reappeared the following season to defeat Bust Out by a head in the December Festival Hurdle. In the 2002 Champion Hurdle Istabraq was the favourite of the 15 runners. However Swan pulled him up after 2 hurdles. The race was won by Hors La Loi III. After the race Swan said "I jumped the first and his action went. I jumped the second and thought he might get a bit better but he didn't and I just thought, for the good of the horse, to pull him up". Istabraq was later found to have pulled muscles in his back. Istabraq was retired after the race.

Retirement 
After retirement Istabraq was moved to Martinstown home of owner J. P. McManus.

Pedigree

Note: b. = Bay, br. = Brown, ch. = Chestnut
 Through his dam he is inbred 4x4 to Princequillo. This means that the stallion appears twice in the fourth generation of his pedigree.

See also
 Repeat winners of horse races

References

External links
 Istabraq's pedigree and partial racing stats
 Istabraq - The Quest for Greatness (video)
 Racing Post Istabraq file

1992 racehorse births
Racehorses trained in Ireland
Racehorses bred in Ireland
National Hunt racehorses
Cheltenham Festival winners
Champion Hurdle winners
Thoroughbred family 4-d